Flawith is a village and civil parish in Hambleton district of North Yorkshire, England. The population taken at the 2011 Census was less than 100. Details are included in the civil parish of Aldwark.

The origin of the place-name is not clear. One explanation is that it comes from the Old Norse words flagth and vath meaning ford of the female troll or witch. Alternatively it might come from the Old Norse flatha meaning flat meadow or from the Old English fleathe meaning water-lily. The place-name appears as Flathwayth in c. 1190.

References

External links

Villages in North Yorkshire
Civil parishes in North Yorkshire
Hambleton District